Konstantinos Dimitriadis (20 March 1931 – 11 August 2020), better known by his pen name Dinos Christianopoulos,  was a Greek contemporary and post-war poet, novelist, folklorist, and scholar. He is known for writing the couplet: "They tried to bury us. They didn't know we were seeds." He was also a music scholar who wrote of rebetiko.

Biography
Dimitriadis was born in Thessaloniki on 20 March 1931, the son of a refugee from East Thrace. He received a degree in Classical Studies from the Aristotle University of Thessaloniki in 1955. He worked as a librarian from 1958 to 1965.

His first poem Age of Lean Cows was published in 1947. He was influenced by Constantine P. Cavafy and T.S. Eliot. Dimitriadis was gay, but he never claimed his sexuality.
He was awarded the 2011 National Grand Prix for Literature, but refused to pick it up. Aristotle University of Thessaloniki awarded him an honorary doctorate in June 2011.

He died on 11 August 2020 at the age of 89. His work was donated to the Aristotle University of Thessaloniki.

Bibliography
 Season of the Lean Cows, 1950
 Indefensible Yearning, 1960
 Fresh Water Stories, 1980
 The Body and the Wormwood
 The downward turn: Fourteen short stories, 1994

References

1931 births
2020 deaths
Modern Greek poets
Greek short story writers
20th-century Greek poets
Greek folklorists
Greek LGBT poets
Greek gay writers
20th-century Greek LGBT people
21st-century Greek LGBT people
People from Thessaloniki